The Mildef Tarantula HMAV is a Malaysian 4×4 V-hull mine-resistant infantry mobility vehicle that provides high level protection against a variety of battlefield threats such as mines and improvised explosive devices. The vehicle was designed and manufactured by Mildef International Technologies alongside Science Technology Research Institute for Defense (STRIDE) and the Malaysian Armed Forces. It was first launched on 11 February 2021. 

The vehicle was developed as a wheeled armoured personnel carrier with mine-resistance capability and also to have good agility in the battlefield. It was made to reduce dependence on foreign-made armored vehicles.

History
The development of the vehicle took four years to complete with the total cost of RM16 million for the research and development. One prototype was built and launched on 11 February 2021 and it's expected to be tested by the Malaysian Armed Forces. This vehicle uses 70% local components while the other 30% was made from foreign components such as the transmission, the engine and the weapon system.

The development of the vehicle was assisted by the Science Technology Research Institute for Defence (STRIDE) with the Malaysian Armed Forces. On 2 April 2021, Mildef HMAV has been officially named "Tarantula".

According to the Defence Minister Datuk Seri Ismail Sabri Yaakob, some unnamed Middle Eastern countries have expressed interest in acquiring the Tarantula. Mildef has said that they are looking to export the Tarantula to ASEAN member countries, followed by countries outside the region.

In the DSA 2022 convention, Mildef unveiled the Tarantula in an APC configuration.

Design
The Tarantula 4×4 has a length of 5.6 metres, width of 2.5 metres and height of 2.5 metres. The weight of the vehicle is 14 tonnes. It is powered by a Caterpillar engine with a capacity of 7.2 liters of turbocharged diesel with a horsepower of 330 and 1116 Nm of torque and capable of reaching speeds up to 110 kilometres/hour.

The Tarantula has been qualified with NATO's STANAG 4569 standard where their ballistic protection is compatible with STANAG 4569 Level 2 for ballistic and artillery. The vehicle is compatible with STANAG 4569 level 2B and the hull protection is compatible with STANAG 4569 level 2A. 

The main armament consists of a 12.7mm RCWS. It's equipped with smoke grenade dischargers for self defence protection.

After the Tarantula was first announced in February 2021, the vehicle was tested for nine days through 700 km of road testing and 300 km off-road, followed by highway endurance, fuel efficiency, load, winching, slope, mounting and dismounting, climbing and braking, including a one-metre fording test.

According to Mildef CEO Datuk Seri Mohd Nizam Kasa, the construction of the Tarantula consists of 70% local content (chassis, body and engine system) and 30% (axle, six-speed transmission and engine) foreign content.

Operators

Current operators
: 2 units (prototypes for testing).

Future operators
 100 HMAVs ordered by undisclosed buyer.

Potential operators
 : In October 2021, East Timor has expressed interest to buy the Mildef Tarantula HMAV 4×4.

See also 

 Mildef Rentaka, reconnaissance vehicle made by Mildef

References

External links
 HMAV on Mildef website

All-wheel-drive vehicles
Military vehicles of Malaysia
Armoured fighting vehicles of Malaysia
Military vehicles introduced in the 2020s
Wheeled armoured personnel carriers
Armoured personnel carriers of the post–Cold War period